The 1994–95 Boston Bruins season was the team's 71st season. The Bruins had a solid season, finishing fourth in the Eastern Conference with 57 points. During the regular season, they had the most shots on goal (1,651) and allowed the fewest shots on goal (1,168) of any team in the league. They also allowed the fewest powerplay goals (24) and had the best penalty-killing % (86.89%) of all 26 teams.

Offseason

Regular season

Final standings

Schedule and results

Playoffs

The Bruins were favored to win their quarterfinal playoff series against the New Jersey Devils, but were shocked by the Devils in the first two games at the Boston Garden by scores of 5–0 and 3–0. The Bruins won game three at the Meadowlands in New Jersey, 3–2, despite being outshot 33 to 17. Boston goaltender Blaine Lacher was solid in net, stopping 31 New Jersey shots. Game four on Friday, May 12 at the Meadowlands started out as a goaltending battle between Lacher and Martin Brodeur. The two teams skated to a 0–0 tie after three regulation periods. This game would prove to be the turning point in the series, as a Boston goal would tie the series at two games apiece and give the Bruins home-ice advantage once again; a New Jersey goal would put the Bruins down three games to one in the series and give the Devils a chance to take the series in game five in Boston. Devils forward Randy McKay ended up scoring the winner at 8:51 of the first overtime period. The Devils closed out the series in game five on Sunday, May 14, in what was the last official NHL game ever played at the Boston Garden.

Eastern Conference Quarterfinals

New Jersey Devils 4, Boston Bruins 1

Player statistics

Skaters

Goaltending

† Denotes player spent time with another team before joining the Bruins. Stats reflect time with the Bruins only.
‡ Denotes player was traded mid-season. Stats reflect time with the Bruins only.

Awards and honors

Draft picks

References
 Bruins on Hockey Database

Boston Bruins seasons
Boston Bruins
Boston Bruins
Boston Bruins
Boston Bruins
Bruins
Bruins